The Sumatran leafbird (Chloropsis media) is a species of bird in the family Chloropseidae. It is endemic to forest and plantations in Sumatra in Indonesia. It has often been included as a subspecies of the golden-fronted leafbird (C. aurifrons), but the two differ extensively in, among others, morphology, with the male of the Sumatran leafbird having a yellow (not deep orange) forehead, and the female resembling a female blue-winged leafbird, but with a yellowish forecrown and no blue to the wings and tail (very different from the golden-fronted leafbird, where the male and female are very similar).

References

 Wells, D. R. (2005). Chloropsis media (Sumatran Leafbird). P. 266 in: del Hoyo, J., A. Elliott, & D. A. Christie. eds. (2005). Handbook of the Birds of the World. Vol. 10. Cuckoo-shrikes to Thrushes. Lynx Edicions, Barcelona.

Sumatran leafbird
Birds of Sumatra
Endemic fauna of Sumatra
Sumatran leafbird
Sumatran leafbird
Taxonomy articles created by Polbot